Edward Felsenthal (born September 3, 1966) is an American journalist. He is the editor-in-chief of Time, a fortnightly news magazine.

Early life 
Felsenthal was born into a Jewish family on September 3, 1966, in Memphis, Tennessee, where he attended Memphis University School. Felsenthal graduated with an A.B. from the Woodrow Wilson School of Public and International Affairs at Princeton University in 1988 after completing a 149-page long senior thesis titled "The Super Tuesday Strategy: Democratic Response to Transformations in Southern Politics." He then received a Juris Doctor degree from Harvard Law School, and a Master of Arts in Law and Diplomacy from the Fletcher School of Law and Diplomacy at Tufts University.

Career 
Felsenthal began his career at The Wall Street Journal, where he covered the US Supreme Court and later became an editor overseeing the Journals efforts to expand its consumer and lifestyle coverage. He was the founding editor of the "Personal Journal" section, guiding work that led to two Pulitzer Prizes, and later oversaw news strategy and integration of the print and digital teams. He was named Deputy Managing Editor of the Journal in 2005.

In 2008, he worked with Tina Brown to launch The Daily Beast as the first executive editor.

He joined Time in 2013 as Digital Managing Editor, where he led an expansion that established a 24/7 news and video operation. In 2016, he became Group Digital Director for Time Inc., overseeing 12 news and lifestyle sites. He became the 18th editor of Time in September 2017, succeeding Nancy Gibbs.

References

External links 
 Profile at Time

Time (magazine) people
American magazine editors
20th-century American Jews
Writers from Memphis, Tennessee
Princeton School of Public and International Affairs alumni
Harvard Law School alumni
The Fletcher School at Tufts University alumni
The Wall Street Journal people
Editors of New York City newspapers
1966 births
Living people
21st-century American Jews
Jewish American journalists